Egidio Micheloni (born September 27, 1913 in San Martino Buon Albergo) was an Italian professional footballer who played as a goalkeeper.

Honours
Juventus
 Coppa Italia winner: 1941–42.

1913 births
Year of death missing
Italian footballers
Serie A players
Hellas Verona F.C. players
A.C. Milan players
Juventus F.C. players
Association football goalkeepers
Sportspeople from the Province of Verona
Footballers from Veneto